Vunipola is the surname of various members of the rugby-playing Vunipola family that originated in Tonga, including:

 Elisi Vunipola (born 1967), played for Tonga and various clubs
 Manu Vunipola (born ), played for Tonga, later Minister for Sports in Tonga
 Fe'ao Vunipola (born 1969), played for Tonga and various Welsh clubs
 Mako Vunipola (born 1991), son of Fe'ao, a prop for Saracens, England and the British & Irish Lions
 Billy Vunipola (born 1992), son of Fe'ao, a number 8 for Saracens and England

See also
 Vunipola Fifita (born 1996), Tongan-born Australian rugby union player